Good Girl is a 2002 studio album by Swedish pop and country singer Jill Johnson. It peaked at number 37 on the Swedish Albums Chart. The album was recorded in Nashville, Tennessee in the United States.

Track listing
Jump in a Car - 3:43
What's Wrong with You - 3:41
Faking Loving Me - 3:19
Luckiest People - 4:16
Good Girl - 3:04
Too Much of You (Ain't Enough for Me) - 3:01
Just Like You Do - 3:40
Astroturf - 3:46
Moonlight and Roses - 3:21
Simply Because of Me - 3:48
I Didn't Know My Heart Could Break - 3:22
Final Call - 3:37

Charts

References

External links

2002 albums
Jill Johnson albums